Grooves is an American electronic music magazine founded in 1999 by editor Sean Portnoy, initially concentrating on the then-burgeoning IDM music genre and expanding to its more experimental, abstract offshoots, such as microsound, microhouse and glitch, eventually encompassing a global view of musicians and cross-cultural influences that is reflected in coverage of jungle, two-step, avant rap, broken beat and other offbeat new music. The headquarters is in San Francisco.

Early issues contained a vast range of full-length album and 12" single/EP reviews; later issues added new media release types, including reviews of books and DVD-based documentary and music video film releases. Additionally, each issue contained several artist interviews and label profiles, evaluations of new and offbeat digital and analog hardware and software tools for making electronic music, and coverage of live performances and festivals throughout the United States, Canada, South America and Europe.

Catalog 
The first eighteen issues were printed and distributed worldwide through record stores and by subscription quarterly.  In December 2005, after 18 issues, the magazine switched to an exclusively online format. The first two digital issues, were made available through a web-based interface provided by Texterity. Podcasts and forums were added in mid-2006. Since then, features and review articles have been made available directly through the main site.

Issue 01 

Features
 Richard Devine
 Wagon Christ
 V/VM
 Kid 606
 Keith Whitman
 Puppy
 Lexaunculpt
 Slicker

Live reviews
 Electric Company / Lexaunculpt
 Chain Reaction Tour : Pole / Scion / Substance / Vainquer
 CMJ Music Conference : Coldcut / Ryuichi Sakamoto / Talvin Singh / DJ Krush + Dub Tribe Sound System

Gear reviews
 None

Issue 02 

Features
 Funki Porcini
 Not Breathing
 Mark Pistel
 Suction
 Jake Mandell
 Add N to (X)
 Funkstörung
 Trans Am

Live reviews
 Winter Music Conference
 Meat Beat Manifesto / Emergency Broadcast Network / Low Res
 Swayzak
 Kurtis Mantronik / Cut Creator / Shortee & Faust

Gear reviews
 None

Issue 03 

Features
 Curd Duca and Headcase
 Delarosa & Asora
 Solenoid
 Kracfive
 Saundart
 12K
 Jega
 Andrea Parker
 Mu-Ziq
 Mego Records
 Neotropic

Live reviews
 Coachella Festival
 Soundboy Yakuza Tour
 Funkstörung
 808 State

Gear reviews
 None

Issue 04 

Features
 Mad Monkey Records
 No Type
 Plone
 Chessie
 DJ Faust and DJ Shortee
 ISAN
 Stewart Walker
 Accelera Deck
 Third Eye Foundation
 Kit Clayton
 Tarwater
 DJ Krush

Live reviews
 Unit and Datachi
 Mu-Ziq, Luke Vibert and B. J. Cole

Gear reviews
 None

Issue 05 

Features
 Arovane
 Atom Heart
 DAT Politics
 Datachi
 Electric Company (band)
 Farben
 Francisco López
 Freeform
 Jimi Tenor
 Lackluster
 Marumari
 Neina
 Ninja Tune
 Oval
 Persona
 Zipperspy

Live reviews
 MUTEK 2000
 Kid 606, Blectum from Blechdom and Languis
 Pole, Burnt Friedman, Kit Clayton, Farben, Low Res and John Tejada
 DJ Krush, Legend of Phoenix, DJ Dusk
 Oval and Sporangia
 Tonic Emlam Super-Electro.fiesta 2000

Gear reviews
 NI Reaktor
 Steinberg Cubasis VST

Issue 06 

Features
 Peaches
 Manitoba
 Adult
 Neutral
 Senking
 Freescha
 Metamatics
 While
 KK Null
 Rephlex Records
 Matmos
 Phoenecia
 Tortoise
 Plaid
 Mouse on Mars
 Pan sonic

Live reviews
 Autechre and Luke Vibert
 Fennesz, Alva Noto, I-Sound and Apestaartje
 Scanner and Carsten Nicolai
 Janek Schaefer, Duplo Remote and Antenna Farm

Book reviews
 The Ambient Century, Mark Prendergast
 MP3: The Definitive Guide, Scot Hacker
 Modulations, edited by Peter Shapiro

Gear reviews
 Propellerheads Reason
 NI Spektral Delay

Issue 07 

Features
 Autechre
 Herbert
 Bogdan Raczyinski
 Janek Schaefer
 James Coleman
 Manual
 Nic Endo
 Rafael Toral
 Dan Abrams
 Gridlock (band)
 Twine
 Safety Scissors
 Andreas Tilliander
 Paul Lansky
 Smalltown Supersound
 Defocus
 Susumu Yokota

Live reviews
 Sin Festival
 Tortoise, Nobukazu Takemura, Prefuse 73, Mr. Lif and DJ Muet

Gear reviews
 NI Traktor
 NI Reaktor 3
 Mixman DM2
 Cakewalk Sonar XL
 AA Tassman 2
 ILS Fruity Loops 3
 NI Absynth
 Fxpansion DR-008
 Cycling74 MES iSynth
 Steinberg Waldorf Attack
 ProjectOne Bombthatbeat 1.5
 Emagic EVP88

Issue 08 

Features
 Boards of Canada
 Faust (musician)
 The Black Dog
 Drexiciya
 Hrvatski
 Super_Collider
 Anti-Pop Consortium
 Nanoloop
 Venetian Snares
 DJ Vadim
 Tim Hecker
 Greg Davis
 Telefon Tel Aviv
 Somatic Responses
 Sogar

Live reviews
 All Tomorrow's Parties - Los Angeles
 Adult, I Am Spoonbender, The Faint
 Rhizome.LA

Gear reviews
 Ableton Live 1
 Sonic Syndicate Orion Pro 2.75
 Cakewalk Plasma
 NI FM7
 LoftSoft FMHeaven
 Vaz2010
 Sonic Syndicate Junglist 3.0
 PSP VintageWarmer
 reFX Trasher II
 Midiman Oxygen8
 Cycling74 Max/MSP 4

Issue 09 

Features
 Amon Tobin
 Fennesz
 Múm
 Negativland
 Suicide
 Bombardier
 Dalek
 Kettel
 Rob Mazurek
 Ikue Mori
 Bola
 Swayzak

Live reviews
 MUTEK 2002 Festival
 El-P, Aesop Rock and Mr. Lif
 Colongib and Octopus Inc.
 Matmos, People Like Us and Wobbly
 Alec Empire

Gear reviews
 Tascam X-9 mixer
 Tascam US-224
 Sony Acid Pro 4
 Steinberg Cubase SX
 NI Kontakt
 Cycling74 Pluggo 3
 Spectrasonics Stylus

Issue 10 

Features
 Pole
 Prefuse 73
 Takemura
 Copenhagen sound
 Mille Plateaux
 Mira Calix
 CoH
 Blevin Blechtum
 Ehlers
 Philip Jeck
 Mike Ladd
 Matthew Shipp
 Dev79
 Hecate
 Demotic
 Oye

Live reviews
 Micro_MUTEK 2003 Festival
 Lali Puna, Opiate, Pulseprogramming and Styrofoam
 Keith Rowe, Toshimaru Nakamura, Nmperign and Le Quan Ninh
 Kling Klang, Macrocosmica and The Beale

Gear reviews
 AA Tassman 3
 Mackie Control and JLCooper CS-32
 NI Traktor 2
 GMedia Oddity
 Steinberg Plex
 Ohmforce Ohmboyz
 Ableton Live 2

Issue 11 

Features
 Kid 606
 Mu-Ziq
 Broadcast
 Gold Chains
 Si Begg
 Alejandra & Aeron
 Unit and Co.ad.audio
 Tied & Tickled Trio
 Mariana Rosenfeld
 End
 EU
 Donna Summer
 Ellen Allien
 Miles Tilman
 Cex
 Ui
 Davide Balula
 Désormais
 Midwest Product

Live reviews
 MUTEK 2004 Festival
 All Tomorrow's Parties
 Sonar Festival
 DAT Politics, Keith Whitman and Misterinterrupt
 Kid 606, DJ /rupture, Pole and The Bug

Gear reviews
 NI Reaktor 4
 Roland VariOS Open System Module
 Moog Modular V
 Cakewalk Project 5
 Clavia Nord Lead 2X
 Steinberg Xphrase
 Vokator

Issue 12 

Features
 Meat Beat Manifesto
 Plastikman
 AGF
 Badawi
 Mice Parade
 Christopher Willits
 Matthew Dear
 Electric Birds
 Dean Roberts
 Aelters
 Trapist
 Bochum Welt
 Egg
 Tod Dockstader
 Sami Koivikko
 Randy H. Y. Yau
 Diverse

Live reviews
 Matmos
 Ellen Allien, Raumschmiere and Apparat
 2003 Northern California Noisefest

Gear reviews
 Final Scratch
 Soundart Chameleon
 Arturia CS-80V
 FXpansion BFD
 NI Absynth 2
 Cycling74 Radial 1.1
 Five12 Numerology 1.2

Issue 13 

Features
 Vladislav Delay
 Funkstörung
 cLouddead
 Lali Puna
 Asmus Tietchens
 Slicker
 RJD2
 Felix Kubin
 Datachi
 Superpitcher

Live reviews
 Philadelphia Laptop Battle
 Donna Summer, End and Nathan Michel

Gear reviews
 Nord Lead Modular G2
 Elektron Monomachine
 Zero-G Morphology
 Camel Audio Cameleon 5000
 Steinberg Groove Agent
 Novation Remote25 Audio
 Antares Fitter
 Dash Signature EVE
 Sugar Bytes Artillery

Issue 14 

Features
 Pan Sonic
 To Rococo Rot
 Two Lone Swordsmen
 Animal Collective
 Black Dice
 The Hafler Trio
 !!!
 Pimmon
 Daedelus

Live reviews
 Throbbing Gristle
 OnceTwice Festival
 No Fun Festival
 Luomo
 Greg Davis, Marumari and Coachella
 Philadelphia Laptop Battle 2
 Kid 606, Knifehandchop and Trans Am

Gear reviews
 Minimoog V
 impOSCar
 AA Tassman 4
 NI Intakt/Dicer
 melOHMan
 reFx Vanguard
 Cycling74 M
 Roland Hypersonic VS-2400CD
 Quake Trap Mophreak
 Cycling74 Cycles 1

Issue 15 

Features
 Biosphere
 Mouse on Mars
 Eastern European electronic music feature
 DJ Olive
 Radian
 DJ /rupture
 Solvent
 Kammerflier Kollektief
 Bizz Circuits
 Knifehandchop

Live reviews
 MUTEK 2004 Festival
 Keith Fullerton Whitman, Krystyna Bobrowski and Christopher Willits
 Telephon Tel Aviv, Slicker and Shin Tasaki
 Ghostly International Night
 Bang on a Can, Somei Satoh and Nobukazu Takemura

Gear reviews
 Ableton Live 4
 CD turntable lineup
 Roland Fantom XR
 Steinberg Halion 3
 Moog Music MuRF
 EastWest Vapor
 Cycling74 Mode
 Steinberg Wavelab 5
 Waves IR
 Cycling74 Cycles: Unnatural Rhythms

Issue 16 

Features
 Richard Chartier
 Buck 65
 Styrofoam
 Ultra-red
 Günter Müller
 Daniel Givens
 Michael Mayer
 Theatres of Eternal Music: Drone Feature
 2004 Top Ten Picks
 Gustav
 My Robot Friend
 Ada
 L'Altra
 Birchville Cat Motel
 M83

Live reviews
 Hefty Records Immediate Action Night
 Philadelphia Laptop Battle 3
 Matmos and Monica Youn
 Colder and Home Video
 Dälek
 LCD Soundsystem

Gear reviews
 AA Ultra Analog
 Sequencer Showdown
 Nomad Factory Blue Tubes Bundle
 NI Battery 2
 Metasonix TX-1
 Wusik Wusikstation
 NI Electronics Instruments 2
 M-Audio/Glaresoft iDrum
 Cycling74 Cycles:Incidental Gestures

Issue 17 

Features
 Prefuse 73
 Autechre
 Four Tet
 Monolake
 Sole
 Out Hud
 Tarwater
 Fog
 Keiichiro Shibuya
 Drop the Lime
 Nathan Michel
 TV Pow
 The Books

Live reviews
 Next Festival 2004
 What Is Music? Festival
 Wheels Instead of Hooves
 Activating the Medium 2005

Gear reviews
 Spectrasonics Stylus RMX 1.2
 Arturia Arp 2600 V
 Hartmann Music Neuron VS
 E-mu Proteus X
 Ableton Operator
 Propellerheads Reason Drum Kits
 Audio Damage Deverb/Discord

Issue 18 

Features
 Fennesz
 Merzbow
 Alias
 Festivus Maximus
 Peter Rehberg
 Hair Police
 Minotaur Shock
 8 Frozen Modules
 Juan Maclean
 Ezekiel Honig
 Mobius Band
 Malcolm Kipe
 Mixel Pixel
 DJ C

Live reviews
 MUTEK 2005 Festival
 No Fun Festival
 Coachella Valley Music and Arts Festival 2005
 Kraftwerk
 Caribou, Junior Boys and The Russian Futurists
 The Books, Keith Fullerton Whitman and Greg Davis
 DAT Politics, Oly and No Funeral
 Autechre and Rob Hall
 Prefuse 73, Battles and Four Tet
 Yasanao Tone, Tim Hecker, Mark Stewart, Aphex Twin, Whitehouse

Gear reviews
 NI Reaktor 5
 Tascam GigaStudio 3
 NI Synthetic Drums 2
 Propellerheads Reason 3
 NI Kontakt 2
 M-Audio Trigger Finger
 Pioneer CDJ-200
 NI Absynth 3
 Digidesign Synchronic

References

Online music magazines published in the United States
Quarterly magazines published in the United States
Dance music magazines
Defunct magazines published in the United States
Magazines established in 1999
Magazines disestablished in 2005
Magazines published in San Francisco
Online magazines with defunct print editions
1999 establishments in the United States